Reunert Sidney Bauser (1928-2017) was a South African involved in all the aspects of the provincial rugby team, Griquas, and a Grand Master of The Freemasons in South Africa.

Roots

Bauser was born on 25 December 1928 in Kimberley, Cape Province, South Africa.  He was the son of Cecil Reunert Bauser and Virginia Coetzee. He married Valerie Faith  in 1952. The couple had three children. He died on 28 December 2017 in Kimberley. Kimberley is a city in the Northern Cape Province, South Africa. It is also the capital of the Province. Kimberley is known for  diamond mining.

Education and career

Bauser completed his schooling at CBC. At CBC he was captain of both the first team in rugby and cricket. Thereafter he qualified himself as an office technician in Johannesburg, Transvaal. He started to work at De Beers, a diamond company in the labour relations division. He worked at De Beers for 40 years.

Sport

Rugby player

He played rugby in the lock position for the provincial team Griqualand West  in 1951 to 1952. A knee injury stopped his rugby career. He played with Springbok fly half /centre Ian Kirkpatrick for the Griqua team. Griqualand West is area located centrally in South Africa , and is part of the Northern Cape

Coach

He coached a local Kimberley rugby club called De Beers rugby club from 1958-1971.

Referee

Bauser was a provincial rugby referee between 1958-1969.

Provincial selector

Ronnie Bauser was a provincial selector for the Griqualand West Rugby Union in 1969-1970. In 1970 the Griquas won the Currie Cup. The Currie Cup series is the local provincial rugby team playing against each other.

President of  Griqualand West Rugby Union

From 1977-1992 he was president of the union.  He succeeded W. Hammond. In 1992 A.T. Markgraaff took over from him. While he was president he was against dirty play in rugby.

Freemasonry

He was Grand Master of the Freemasons in South Africa, from 1991 to 1997. He succeeded C.B. Groenewald. In 1997 B.G. Lindeque took over from him.

References 

1928 births
2017 deaths
Griquas (rugby union) players
Rugby union players from Kimberley, Northern Cape
Rugby union locks
South African Freemasons